Hendersonville High School may refer to:

 Hendersonville High School (North Carolina)
 Hendersonville High School (Tennessee)